Chan Ho Man can refer to
Benny Chan Ho Man, an actor in Hong Kong
Chan Ho Man (footballer), a football player in Hong Kong